Marwan, Merwan or Marwen or Mervan ( marwān), is an Arabic male given name derived from the word marū/ maruw (مرو) with the meaning of either minerals, "flint(-stone)", "quartz" or "a hard stone of nearly pure silica". However, the Arabic name for quartz is ṣawwān (صَوَّان).

The name is also the name of a type of genus of the herbal plant basil. 

Variants include Merouane / Marouane / Marouan. Feminine forms of the name include Marwa / Marwah and Marwana/ Marwanah (مروانة marwānah).

Notable persons with these names include:

Given name

Marwan
Marwan I, Umayyad caliph (r. 684–685)
Marwan II, Umayyad caliph (r. 744–750)
Marwan ibn Abi Hafsa (d. 797), Abbasid-era poet
Marwan (rapper), Danish-Palestinian rapper Mohamed Marwan 
Marwan Ali, Tunisian pop singer
Marwan Barghouti, leader of the Palestinian group Fatah
Marwan Charbel, Lebanese general and politician
Marwan Dudin (1936–2016), Jordanian politician
Marwan Hamadeh, Lebanese politician
Marwan Hamed, Egyptian film director
Marwan Kassab-Bachi (1934–2016), German painter of Syrian origin
Marwan Kenzari, Dutch Tunisian actor
Marwan Khoury, Lebanese artist
Marwan al-Muasher, Jordanian politician
Marwan al-Shehhi, 9/11 terrorist from the UAE

Mervan 
Mervan Çelik, Swedish footballer of Kurdish descent

Merwan 
Meher Baba, (1894–1969), Indian spiritual leader born Merwan Sheriar Irani
Merwan Rim, French actor and singer-songwriter
Merwan ha-Levi, 11th-century philanthropist of Narbonne

Surname
Ashraf Marwan, Egyptian businessman

Ibn / Bint / Abu
 Abd al-Malik ibn Marwan (r. 685–705) was the Umayyad caliph of the Arab Caliphate.
 Abd al-Aziz ibn Marwan Caliphal governor of Egypt for 685 to 705.
 Mu'awiya ibn Marwan, son of Umayyad caliph Marwan I.
 Bishr ibn Marwan, Umayyad provincial governor.
 Aban ibn Marwan, Governor of Palestine under Umayyad caliph Abd al-Malik. 
 Uthman ibn Marwan, son of Marwan I.
 Ubayd Allah ibn Marwan Army commander
 Ayyub ibn Marwan, son of Umayyad caliph Marwan I.
 Dawud ibn Marwan, son of Umayyad caliph Marwan I.
 Umar ibn Marwan, son of Umayyad caliph Marwan I.
 Muhammad ibn Marwan, son of caliph Marwan I, Governor of Caliphal province of Armenia and Father of Marwan II.
 Ubaydallah ibn Marwan ibn Muhammad, was an Umayyad prince, son of caliph Marwan II.
 Abdallah ibn Marwan ibn Muhammad was an Umayyad prince.
Asma bint Marwan, a medieval Arabian female poet (7th century)
Ibn Marwan, chieftain in the Al-Andalus (9th century)
Ubayd Allah Abu Marwan, general in the Al-Andalus (8th/9th century)

Fictional characters
Habib Marwan, in the TV drama 24

See also 
Marwanids (990–1085), Kurdish dynasty

Arabic-language surnames
Arabic masculine given names
Moroccan masculine given names
Turkish masculine given names